Diane Schnapp (born 29 June 1968) is a former American rugby union player. She participated in the 1998 Women's Rugby World Cup and the 1999 Hong Kong Women's Sevens. Schnapp played at openside flank.

Though small in size, Schnapp's strength, courage, and character as a monster on the field made her one of ten greatest North American players. She is also considered the nation's best defensive player and was thus named to the 2000-2009 Women’s Rugby Team and Players of the Decade from Rugbymag.com.

References 

Living people
United States women's international rugby union players
American female rugby union players
Female rugby union players
1956 births
21st-century American women